Richard Clebert (born November 15, 1985) is an American football defensive lineman who is currently a free agent. He played college football at South Florida.

High school career
A native of Miami, Clebert attended Miami Edison Senior High School. He was part of the "Edison Five" who signed with South Florida in 2004, along with running back Chad Simpson, tackle Marc Dile, and receiver Jackie Chambers. Regarded as a three-star recruit, he was listed as the No. 50 defensive tackle available in his class.

College career
Clebert was a three-year starter at nose tackle for South Florida. He had 22 tackles as a junior, and 31 as senior. Known for his weight room prowess, he reportedly bench-pressed 225 pounds 43 times.

Professional career

2008 NFL Draft
Clebert was graded as the 31st defensive tackle available in the 2008 NFL Draft by Sports Illustrated. In a draft that saw 18 defensive tackles selected, he went undrafted. In the off-season, he tried out for the New Orleans Saints but did not earn a contract.

He was signed by the Tampa Bay Buccaneers on January 24, 2013, and was released on May 6, 2013.

Arena football
Clebert has played for four teams in the Arena Football League, and was the starting nose guard for two ArenaBowl winners.  With the Spokane Shock in 2010, he recovered a fumble in ArenaBowl XXIII to set up a Spokane touchdown.  He was also part of the Jacksonville Sharks team that won ArenaBowl XXIV in 2011. On December 28, 2015, Clebert was assigned to the Orlando Predators. He was traded to the Philadelphia Soul for future considerations on April 16, 2016.

References

External links
Tampa Bay Buccaneers bio 
South Florida Bulls bio 

1985 births
Living people
American football centers
South Florida Bulls football players
Tampa Bay Buccaneers players
New York Sentinels players
Spokane Shock players
Jacksonville Sharks players
Orlando Predators players
Tampa Bay Storm players
Milwaukee Mustangs (2009–2012) players
Philadelphia Soul players
Sportspeople from Queens, New York
Players of American football from New York City